Kim Dong-seon (김동선,  or  ; born 30 May 1989 in Seoul, South Korea) is a South Korean dressage rider. He competed at the 2016 Summer Olympics in Rio de Janeiro, where he placed 43rd in the individual competition aboard Bukowski. He also competed at the 2020 Olympic Games in Tokyo, where he finished 55th in the individual competition.

Kim is a graduate of Dartmouth College. Kim took part at two World Equestrian Games (in 2014 and 2018). His best result was achieved in 2018, when he placed 47th.

He also competed at three Asian Games (in 2006, 2010 and 2014), where he altogether won three team gold medals and an individual silver medal. He qualified for the 2014 Dressage World Cup Finals in Lyon, France, where he finished in 17th position.

In 2017, Kim was arrested after assaulting staff at a bar in Seoul and damaging a police vehicle while being transported to the police station.

In 2020, Kim briefly retired from the international competition in order to pursue a career as an investment banker. He returned to dressage in 2021 with an aim of taking part at the postponed Tokyo Olympics.

References

External links
 

Living people
1989 births
Sportspeople from Seoul
South Korean male equestrians
South Korean dressage riders
Asian Games medalists in equestrian
Equestrians at the 2006 Asian Games
Equestrians at the 2010 Asian Games
Equestrians at the 2014 Asian Games
Equestrians at the 2020 Summer Olympics
Asian Games gold medalists for South Korea
Asian Games silver medalists for South Korea
Equestrians at the 2016 Summer Olympics
Olympic equestrians of South Korea
Medalists at the 2006 Asian Games
Medalists at the 2010 Asian Games
Medalists at the 2014 Asian Games
Investment bankers